Carlo Demarchi (25 March 1890 – 5 October 1972) was an Italian footballer who played as a midfielder. He competed for Italy in the men's football tournament at the 1912 Summer Olympics.

References

External links
 

1890 births
1972 deaths
Italian footballers
Italy international footballers
Olympic footballers of Italy
Footballers at the 1912 Summer Olympics
Footballers from Turin
Association football midfielders
Torino F.C. players